Shakh Quli Khel is a Village and union council of Lakki Marwat District in Khyber Pakhtunkhwa province of Pakistan.

References

Nar Quli Khan is also a village of shakh qulli khan. Muhammad Amin Jan, Fida Hussain Marwat.

Union councils of Lakki Marwat District
Populated places in Lakki Marwat District